Jean-Léo Rochon (3 July 1902 – 21 June 1988) was a Liberal party member of the House of Commons of Canada. He was born in Saint-Augustin, now a part of Mirabel and became an optometrist by career.

He was first elected in the 1935 Quebec general election as a Liberal party member of the short-lived 19th Legislative Assembly of Quebec from November 1935 to August 1936, but only served that one term as a provincial politician.

After several provincial and federal election defeats, Rochon won a House of Commons seat at the Laval riding in the 1962 general election. He was re-elected there in the 1963 and 1965 federal elections. For the 1968 federal election, Rochon was re-elected at the Ahuntsic electoral district. He served his final term in the 28th Canadian Parliament then left federal office in 1972 without campaigning for another term in the House of Commons.

Further reading
 
 

1902 births
1988 deaths
Members of the House of Commons of Canada from Quebec
Liberal Party of Canada MPs
People from Mirabel, Quebec
Quebec Liberal Party MNAs